Hibbard is an unincorporated community in Madison County, Idaho, United States.

Notes

Unincorporated communities in Madison County, Idaho
Unincorporated communities in Idaho